Jerson Cabral (born 3 January 1991) is a Dutch-Cape Verdean professional footballer who plays as a winger for Super League Greece club Ionikos.

Career

Feyenoord
Cabral was scouted by Feyenoord at the age of seven. He made his professional debut for Feyenoord on 8 August 2010. He replaced Diego Biseswar in the 51st minute of the Eredivisie home match against FC Utrecht (3–1). On 27 August 2010, Cabral made his European debut. He replaced Tim de Cler in the 82nd minute of the Europa League away match against Gent (2–0).

At the start of the 2012–13 season Cabral refused to extend his contract, which would expire at the end of the season.

Twente
Cabral was then traded to FC Twente, in exchange of Wesley Verhoek. At FC Twente he signed a four-year contract. His first season at FC Twente was a disappointing one, with only ten appearances.

At the start of the 2013–14 season Cabral was loaned to ADO Den Haag. Here he made 14 appearances in the first team.

During the 2014–15 season Cabral was loaned to Willem II, in the final minutes of the summer transfer window. In their home match against FC Twente that season, he scored twice, leading them to a 2–2 draw.

Bastia
In summer 2016 Cabral moved abroad on a free transfer to play for French side Bastia, but was loaned to Sparta in the January 2017 transfer window.

Levski Sofia
On 12 September 2017, Cabral signed a two year contract with Bulgarian club Levski Sofia.

Pafos
In September 2019 Cabral joined Cypriot side Pafos.

Ionikos
On 10 July 2021, he signed a contract with Ionikos on a free transfer.

International career
Cabral was born in the Netherlands to a Cape Verdean father, and Dutch mother. He played at various levels for Dutch youth teams, including the Netherlands U17s, Netherlands U19s, and Netherlands U21s. In March 2016, Cabral was called up to the Cape Verde national football team for 2017 Africa Cup of Nations qualification against Morocco.

Personal life
Jerson has a twin brother, Jercely. His cousin, Garry Rodrigues, is also a footballer who also played for Levski Sofia before Jerson. Jerson also fathers two daughters and a long time girlfriend.

Career statistics

Club

References

External links
 
 Voetbal International profile 
 Netherlands U17 stats at OnsOranje
 Netherlands U19 stats at OnsOranje
 Netherlands U21 stats at OnsOranje
 Profile at Levskisofia.info

1991 births
Living people
Footballers from Rotterdam
Dutch sportspeople of Cape Verdean descent
Dutch twins
Twin sportspeople
Association football wingers
Dutch footballers
Cape Verdean footballers
Netherlands youth international footballers
Netherlands under-21 international footballers
Feyenoord players
FC Twente players
ADO Den Haag players
Willem II (football club) players
SC Bastia players
Sparta Rotterdam players
PFC Levski Sofia players
Eredivisie players
Eerste Divisie players
Ligue 1 players
First Professional Football League (Bulgaria) players
Dutch expatriate footballers
Expatriate footballers in France
Expatriate footballers in Bulgaria
Dutch expatriate sportspeople in France
Dutch expatriate sportspeople in Bulgaria
Jong FC Twente players
Dutch expatriate sportspeople in Cyprus
Dutch expatriate sportspeople in Greece
Expatriate footballers in Greece
Expatriate footballers in Cyprus
Ionikos F.C. players
Pafos FC players
Dutch people of Cape Verdean descent